The Crain Hill School and Church, in Crain Hill, Tennessee, is a building dating from around 1870.  It was listed on the National Register of Historic Places in 1985.

It is a one-room weatherboarded gable roofed vernacular building, upon a wooden pier foundation which is covered with pressed metal.  Simple decoration includes gable returns and molding around the main entry.

It was built to serve as both a school and place of worship for inhabitants of the Rocky River Valley.  Its last use as a schoolhouse was in 1927 when a new larger school was built further up the Rocky River Road.  It continued to serve as a church until the mid-1900s.

It was a one-room schoolhouse.

References

Schools in Tennessee
One-room schoolhouses in Tennessee
School buildings on the National Register of Historic Places in Tennessee
National Register of Historic Places in Van Buren County, Tennessee
Buildings and structures completed in 1870
1870 establishments in Tennessee